The Partita in A minor for solo flute, BWV 1013,  is a partita in four movements composed by Johann Sebastian Bach. Its date of composition is uncertain, though on the basis of its advanced playing technique, which is more demanding than in the flute part for the Fifth Brandenburg Concerto, for example, it must have been written after 1723. The title, however, is the work of 20th-century editors. The title in the only surviving 18th-century manuscript is "Solo p[our une] flûte traversière par J. S. Bach".

History
The discoverer of the sole surviving manuscript, Karl Straube, believed it to be an autograph and this view was accepted by Alfred Einstein. However, more recently it has been shown that it was made by two copyists. Although their names are unknown, one appears to be identical with the principal scribe of another manuscript, P 267 (containing the violin sonatas and partitas, BWV 1001–1006), which places this part of the copy of the Partita in the first half of the 1720s. The other scribe is the one now known as "Anonymous 5", an employee of Bach who must have accompanied him when Bach moved from Köthen to Leipzig in 1723. This scribe is known from authentically dated copies of the Cantatas BWV 186 (11 July 1723) and BWV 154 (9 January 1724). On the basis of watermarks and textual criticism, the greater part of the manuscript was probably copied in Leipzig in 1723–1724, while the copyist of the first five lines of the Partita suggest it may have been begun slightly earlier, between 1722 and 1723 in Köthen.

Movements

The movements of the Partita are marked:
 Allemande
 Corrente
 Sarabande
 Bourrée angloise

Notes

Further reading
 Bennett, William. 2011. "William Bennett Tours the Landscape of the Bach Sarabande". Flute: The Journal of the British Flute Society 30, no. 4 (December) 16–19.
 Bruderhans, Zdenek. 1980. "Allemande from J.S. Bach's Partita in A Minor for Solo Flute BWV 1013". Miscellanea Musicologica: Adelaide Studies in Musicology 11:258–66.
 Castellani, Marcello. 1985. "Il Solo pour la flûte traversière di J.S. Bach: Cöthen o Lipsia?" Il flauto dolce: Rivista semestrale per lo studio e la pratica della musica antica, no. 13 (October): 15–21. Spanish version as "El Solo pour la flûte traversière de J.S. Bach: ¿Coethen o Leipzig?", translated by Antonio Torralba. Musica antiqua: Revista illustrada de música histórica, no. 6 (December–January 1986): 16–19. German version as "J. S. Bachs Solo pour la flûte traversière: Köthen oder Leipzig?", translated by Nikolaus Delius. Tibia: Magazin für Freunde alter und neuer Bläsermusik 14, no. 4 (1989): 567–73.
 Graf, Peter-Lukas. 2000. "Vom Zwang der Metrik befreit: Zur Interpretation von Johann Sebastian Bachs Allemande für Soloflöte BWV 1013". Das Orchester: Zeitschrift für Orchesterkultur und Rundfunk-Chorwesen 48, no. 5:19–23.
 Kobayashi, Yoshitake. 1991. "Noch einmal zu J.S. Bachs Solo pour la flûte traversière BWV 1013". Tibia: Magazin für Freunde alter und neuer Bläsermusik 16, no. 1:379–82.
 Marshall, Robert L. 1981. "Zur Echtheit und Chronologie der Bachschen Flötensonaten: Biographische und stilistische Erwägungen". In Bachforschung und Bachinterpretation heute. Wissenschaftler und Praktiker im Dialog. Bericht uber das Bachfest-Symposium 1978 der Philipps-Universität Marburg, edited by Reinhold Brinkmann, 48–71. Leipzig: Neue Bachgesellschaft.
 Mather, Betty Bang. 2008. "De geheimen van Bachs allemande voor fluit solo ontrafeld". Part 1. Fluit 16, no. 2 (March): 9–11.
 Mather, Betty Bang. 2008. "De geheimen van Bachs allemande voor fluit solo ontrafeld". Part 2. Fluit 16, no. 3 (June): 9–12.
 Mather, Betty Bang, and Elizabeth Ann Sadilek. 2004. Johann Sebastian Bach: Partita in A Minor for Solo Flute BWV 1013, with Emphasis on the Allemande—Historical Clues and New Discoveries for Performers. [US]: Falls House.
 Michel, Winfried. 1992. "'Ein Ton': Das fis im zwanzigsten Takt von Bachs Flötenpartita". In Travers und controvers: Festschrift Nikolaus Delius, edited by Mirjam Nastasi, 67–87.  Celle: Hermann Moeck. .
 Rauterberg, Frauke. 1996. "Die Klangrede einer Soloflöte: Zur rhetorischen Dispositio in der Allemande aus J.S.Bachs Partita a-moll BWV 1013". Musica 50, No. 1 (January–February): 2–8.
 Toeplitz, Uri. 1992. "Zur Sarabande aus dem Solo für die Flöte (BWV 1013) ". Bach-Jahrbuch 78:85–89.

External links 
 
  Short description by Blair Johnston.
 Partita in A minor for solo flute Performed by Tommaso Benciolini (YouTube)
 Partita for solo oboe in G Minor. Performed by Juan Manuel García-Cano Ruiz (YouTube) Transcription for oboe of Partita in A minor for solo flute.

Suites by Johann Sebastian Bach
Solo flute pieces
Compositions in A minor
1718 compositions